Bangladesh participated in the 2016 South Asian Games in Guwahati and Shillong, Bangladesh from 5 February to 16 February 2016.

Medal summary
Bangladesh won 4 golds and a total of 75 medals.

Medal table

References

Nations at the 2016 South Asian Games
2016
South Asian Games